The 2004 Southland Conference baseball tournament was held from May 26 through 29, 2004 to determine the champion of the Southland Conference in the sport of college baseball for the 2004 season.  The event pitted the top six finishers from the conference's regular season in a double-elimination tournament held at Alumni Field, home field of Southeastern Louisiana in Hammond, Louisiana.  Top-seeded  won their second overall championship and claimed the automatic bid to the 2004 NCAA Division I baseball tournament.

Seeding and format
The top six finishers from the regular season were seeded one through six.  They played a double-elimination tournament.

Bracket and results

All-Tournament Team
The following players were named to the All-Tournament Team.

Most Valuable Player
Jordan Foster was named Tournament Most Valuable Player.  Foster was an outfielder for Lamar.

References

Tournament
Southland Conference Baseball Tournament
Southland Conference baseball tournament
Southland Conference baseball tournament